The 2022 Mexico City ePrix was a Formula E electric car race held at the Autódromo Hermanos Rodríguez in the centre of Mexico City on 12 February 2022. It served as the third round of the 2021–22 Formula E season and the sixth edition of the event, and marked a return to the venue after it was used as a field hospital for COVID-19 patients, and subsequently replaced by the Puebla ePrix, in 2021.

Pascal Wehrlein won the race from pole to claim his and his team's first ever Formula E victory, leading a Porsche 1-2 from teammate André Lotterer and Jean-Éric Vergne.

Classification

Qualifying

Qualifying duels

Overall classification

Race 

Notes:
  – Pole position.
  – Fastest lap.
  – Lucas di Grassi received a 5-second time penalty for causing a collision.

Notes

References

|- style="text-align:center"
|width="35%"|Previous race:2022 Diriyah ePrix
|width="30%"|FIA Formula E World Championship2021–22 season
|width="35%"|Next race:2022 Rome ePrix
|- style="text-align:center"
|width="35%"|Previous race:2020 Mexico City ePrix
|width="30%"|Mexico City ePrix
|width="35%"|Next race:2023 Mexico City ePrix
|- style="text-align:center"

2022
2021–22 Formula E season
2022 in Mexican motorsport
February 2022 sports events in Mexico